The Jacksonville Express were a professional American football team based in Jacksonville, Florida which competed in the World Football League (WFL) in 1975. They were preceded in 1974 by the WFL's Jacksonville Sharks, though the two teams had separate ownership and identities. The Express folded when the league ceased operations during the 1975 season.

History 
The Jacksonville Sharks were a professional American football team based in Jacksonville, Florida which competed in the 1974 WFL season. The Sharks folded during that season due to financial difficulties. The WFL returned to Jacksonville the following season with the Jacksonville Express. While head coach Charlie Tate and a few players returned from the Sharks, the Express had new owners (local businessman Earl Knabb along with several minor partners) and a mostly new front office staff. The team's biggest player acquisitions were quarterback George Mira, who had been co-MVP of the 1974 WFL championship game with Birmingham and had been a college All-American with the in-state Miami Hurricanes, and Tommy Reamon, who had led the WFL in rushing in 1974 with the Florida Blazers.

The new ownership group sought to be much more frugal than the free-spending Sharks had been. One notable example of this was that while the Sharks' headquarters had been located in a large suite atop a skyscraper in downtown Jacksonville, the offices of the Express were located in a mall in the basement of a hotel. Accordingly, the franchise was able to meet its financial obligations throughout its short existence. However, the WFL had lost their television contract right before the 1975 season, putting the entire league in serious financial difficulty. The Express had compiled a 6–5 record when the WFL folded in October 1975, 11 games into a planned 20-game schedule.

Schedule and results

1975 regular season

See also
 Jacksonville Sharks (WFL)
 1975 World Football League season

References 

 
Defunct American football teams
Express
1975 establishments in Florida
1975 disestablishments in Florida
American football teams in Florida
American football teams established in 1975
American football teams disestablished in 1975